The 2018–19 Tahiti Ligue 2 was the second highest division of the Tahitian football league. The competition is organized and administered by  Fédération Tahitienne de Football.

Participating Teams

During the 2018–19 season, ten teams registered to play, however, only nine teams participated in the competition, after AS Teva FC withdrew from the competition.

AS Excelsior
Tefana B
AS Olympic Mahina
AS Mataiea
AS Tamarii Punaruu
A.S. Taiarapu
A.S. Papenoo
A.S. Papara
A.S. Vaiete
AS Teva FC(withdrew)

Final classification

References

2
Sports leagues established in 2019